Lasondre Airport  is an airport located in Batu Islands (Indonesian: Pulau-Pulau Batu), South Nias, North Sumatra, Indonesia.

Airlines and destinations

The following destinations are served from Lasondre Airport:

References

Airports in North Sumatra